Lisa Gerritsen (born Lisa Orszag; December 21, 1957) is an American former child actress. She is most famous for her role as Bess, the independent-minded daughter of Phyllis Lindstrom on the 1970s television series The Mary Tyler Moore Show and its spin-off Phyllis.

Early life

Lisa Gerritsen was born Lisa Orszag in Los Angeles and is the granddaughter of child actor and screenwriter True Eames Boardman, and the great-granddaughter of silent film actors True Boardman and Virginia True Boardman. Her acting career began when she was eight years old. Encouraged by her mother and grandfather, she landed her first professional role in an episode of The Doris Day Show in 1968.

Career
After The Doris Day Show, Gerritsen had guest-star or cameo appearances in several television shows including The Odd Couple, Bonanza, The Courtship of Eddie's Father, The Virginian and Family Affair.

She was also cast in several episodes of Gunsmoke, one of which helped her to land a regular role in the 1969 NBC comedy series My World and Welcome to It, which starred William Windom and Joan Hotchkis. The show was based on the cartoons and comedy of author James Thurber.

Gerritsen's role in the main cast of My World and Welcome to It, is one of the high points in her career. The show won several awards including Emmys, although it was cancelled after only one season. Combining animation with live-action sitcom storylines involving cartoonist John Monroe, his wife, daughter and pets, the show's format was unusual for TV. The blend of family strife and social satire included an unconventional relationship between Monroe as father and Gerritsen as genius daughter.

In 1970 Gerritsen (using credit Lisa True Gerritsen) appeared as Hannah Carson on the TV western "The Men From Shiloh" (rebranded name for The Virginian) in the episode titled "Hannah".

On the December 28, 1970, Gunsmoke episode entitled "Jenny," Gerritsen played a 10-year-old who leaves St. Louis after the death of her mother to find her outlaw father, Lucas Pritchard, portrayed by Steve Ihnat.

In 1970, she was cast as Bess Lindstrom, daughter of landlord Phyllis Lindstrom (Cloris Leachman) in The Mary Tyler Moore Show, for which she received critical acclaim. Bess was a precocious child whose mother believed in progressive parenting—Bess always called Phyllis by her first name, read Phyllis's books on child rearing, and was educated on sexuality.

As Phyllis's daughter, Gerritsen established her importance to The Mary Tyler Moore Show in its very first episode. In the premiere episode, test audiences didn't like Rhoda, played by Valerie Harper. Harper eventually became one of the most popular stars on TV, but her initial change from antagonist of Mary (which the audience disliked, since Mary Tyler Moore was universally loved by viewers) occurred because of Gerritsen's Bess. Because Bessto the eternal consternation of Phyllislikes Rhoda and thinks she's funny, the audience changed their opinion of her too, and by the second episode she was Mary's best friend.  Gerritsen returned in the role in the spin-off series Phyllis (1975–1977).

In addition to her television roles, she also was cast in several movies. She made her first big-screen appearance in Airport, playing the role of Libby Bakersfeld. She also appeared as Linda in The War Between Men and Women, which starred Jack Lemmon and Barbara Harris.

Filmography

Film

Television

References

External links

1957 births
American child actresses
American film actresses
Living people
20th-century American actresses
Actresses from Los Angeles
American television actresses
21st-century American women